Daniele Cappellari (born 9 August 1976) is an Italian racing driver currently competing in the TCR International Series and Italian Touring Car Championship. Having previously competed in several historic racing championships.

Racing career
Cappellari began his career in 2000 in the Italian Formula Crono series, he won the championship four times. In 2007 he switched to the Italian Historical Car Championship, he went on to win the title five times, from 2007-12. For 2014 he switched to the Coppa Italia series, he won the Division 1 title that year. Before switching to Division 2, finishing second in championships standings. In 2016 he made the switch to the Italian Touring Car Championship, he finished the season fourth in the standings after three podiums and only one single retirement. He continued in the series again in 2017.

In May 2017 it was announced that he would race in the TCR International Series, driving a SEAT León TCR for his own team CRC - Cappellari Reparto Corse.

Racing record

Complete TCR International Series results
(key) (Races in bold indicate pole position) (Races in italics indicate fastest lap)

† Driver did not finish the race, but was classified as he completed over 90% of the race distance.
* Season still in progress.

References

External links
 
 

1976 births
People from Cittadella
Living people
TCR International Series drivers
Italian racing drivers
Sportspeople from the Province of Padua
TCR Europe Touring Car Series drivers